Logan Colby Suggs (born October 25, 1991) is an American professional baseball coach and former pitcher. He is the bullpen coach for the Minnesota Twins of Major League Baseball. Prior to playing professionally, Suggs attended the University of Arkansas, where he played college baseball for the Arkansas Razorbacks.

Amateur career
Suggs attended Sulphur Springs High School in Sulphur Springs, Texas, and played for the school's baseball and American football teams. In football, he played center for the school's state championship team. He was not selected in the Major League Baseball (MLB) Draft after graduating from high school, so he enrolled at the University of Arkansas to play college baseball for the Arkansas Razorbacks baseball team. Suggs pitched in relief for the Razorbacks. In 2012, he played collegiate summer baseball with the Wareham Gatemen of the Cape Cod Baseball League and was named a league all-star. In 2013, Suggs recorded 13 saves for Arkansas, a Razorbacks record.

Professional career
The Miami Marlins selected Suggs in the second round, with the 73rd overall selection, of the 2013 MLB draft. He signed and spent 2013 with the GCL Marlins, Batavia Muckdogs, and Jupiter Hammerheads, posting a 2–3 record and 3.29 ERA in 27.1 total relief innings pitched between the three teams. He spent 2014 with Jupiter where he was 1–6 with a 5.09 ERA in 26 appearances out of the bullpen and 2015 with the Greensboro Grasshoppers where he pitched in only five games due to injury. Suggs pitched only 5.2 innings in 2016 while on a rehab assignment with the GCL Marlins. He was released in July 2016.

Coaching career
Suggs served as the bullpen coach for the Arkansas Razorbacks in 2018 and joined the Minnesota Twins organization in 2019 as an advance scout. On July 1, 2022, the Twins promoted Suggs to the major leagues as their bullpen coach.

References

External links

1991 births
Living people
People from Sulphur Springs, Texas
Baseball players from Texas
Baseball pitchers
Arkansas Razorbacks baseball players
Wareham Gatemen players
Major League Baseball bullpen coaches
Minnesota Twins coaches